Watford North railway station is a National Rail station which serves the North Watford area in Hertfordshire, England in the United Kingdom. It is adjacent to a level crossing where the Abbey Line crosses Bushey Mill Lane.

Watford North is one of three railway stations in the central Watford area and is operated as an unstaffed railway halt. The Abbey Line service is known locally as the "Abbey Flyer".

History
The branch line to St Albans was opened in 1858 by the London and North Western Railway (LNWR). Watford North station opened 52 years later, in October 1910. Originally named Callowland, the station was built to serve a developing residential and industrial area which still thrives today. It was renamed Watford North in 1927. After the nationalisation of Britain's railways  in 1948, the line was run by British Rail (from 1986 under its Network SouthEast brand).

As passenger and goods usage dwindled in the 1950s and 60s, the stations on the line were downgraded to unmanned halts.

In 1963, Watford North and the Abbey line were threatened with closure as part of the Beeching cuts, but the line was kept in service. In 1995, a proposal was made to run a reduced service on the Abbey line with diesel trains instead of electric trains. An advocacy group, known as Abfly, was formed to campaign for the line to be maintained and continues to lobby for improvements to the service today. After the Privatisation of British Rail the franchise for the Abbey Line was taken over by National Express who ran the line under its Silverlink Metro name until November 2007, when Govia, operating as London Midland, took over the franchise.

The Community Rail Partnership for the Abbey Line, established in 2005, works to improve the Abbey Line and inspects stations such as Watford North at least once a week.

Services
All services at Watford North are operated by London Northwestern Railway. This is increased to a train approximately every 45 minutes in each direction during the peak hours. Services are typically operated using  EMUs.

Future
A number of possible changes to the line have been proposed, including new means of buying tickets, and the restoration of a passing loop at Bricket Wood, which would facilitate a 30-minute service.

Plans were announced in October 2009 for the line to be converted to light rail. Longer-term proposals envisaged extension into St Albans city centre, possibly to St Albans City railway station. It was estimated that the tram line would be in operation by 2012, but the project was cancelled due to the complications and expense of transferring the line from National Rail to the county council. For the foreseeable future, Watford North will continue to be served by heavy rail trains.

References

External links 

 ABFLY campaign group

Railway stations in Watford
Former London and North Western Railway stations
Railway stations in Great Britain opened in 1910
Railway stations served by West Midlands Trains